Mount Pleasant may refer to:

People 
 Frank Mount Pleasant

Places

Australia 
 Mount Pleasant (Australian Capital Territory)
 Mount Pleasant, New South Wales
 Mount Pleasant, Queensland (Moreton Bay Region), a mountain and locality in the Moreton Bay Region, part of the D'Aguilar Range
 Mount Pleasant, Queensland (Mackay Region), a mountain and suburb of Mackay in the Mackay Region
 Mount Pleasant, South Australia
 Mount Pleasant, Western Australia
 Mount Pleasant, Victoria

Canada 
 Mount Pleasant, Calgary, Alberta
 Mount Pleasant, Vancouver, British Columbia
 Mount Pleasant, Nova Scotia (disambiguation)
 Mount Pleasant, Ontario (disambiguation)
 Mount Pleasant, Prince Edward Island
 Rural Municipality of Mount Pleasant No. 2, Saskatchewan

Falkland Islands 
 Mount Pleasant, Falkland Islands

Ireland 
Mountpleasant railway station, County Louth

New Zealand 
 Mount Pleasant, New Zealand, a suburb of Christchurch
 Tauhinukorokio / Mount Pleasant, the Christchurch hill on which the suburb of the English name is placed

United Kingdom 
 Mount Pleasant henge, Dorset, England
 Mount Pleasant, Barcombe, East Sussex, England
 Mount Pleasant, Batley, West Yorkshire, England
 Mount Pleasant, Buckinghamshire, England
 Mount Pleasant, Cambridge, Cambridgeshire, England
 Mount Pleasant, Cornwall, England
 Mount Pleasant, Idridgehay, Site of Special Scientific Interest in Derbyshire, England
 Mount Pleasant, Liverpool, Merseyside, England
 Mount Pleasant, Merthyr Tydfil, Wales
 Mount Pleasant, Newhaven, East Sussex, England
 Mount Pleasant, Spennymoor, County Durham, England
 Mount Pleasant, Staffordshire, England
 Mount Pleasant, Stockton-on-Tees, County Durham, England
 Mount Pleasant, Swansea, Wales
 Mount Pleasant, Warwickshire, England
 Mount Pleasant Mail Centre, Clerkenwell, London, the largest sorting office operated by Royal Mail

United States 
(by state then city)
 Mount Pleasant, Arkansas
 Mount Pleasant, Delaware
 Mount Pleasant (Smyrna, Delaware)
 Mount Pleasant, Florida
 Mount Pleasant, Evans County, Georgia
 Mount Pleasant, Wayne County, Georgia
 Mount Pleasant, Cass County, Indiana
 Mount Pleasant, Delaware County, Indiana
 Mount Pleasant, Johnson County, Indiana
 Mount Pleasant, Martin County, Indiana
 Mount Pleasant, Perry County, Indiana
 Mount Pleasant, Iowa
 Mount Pleasant, Kansas
 Mount Pleasant, Kentucky (disambiguation), several locations
 Mount Pleasant, Maryland
 Mount Pleasant, Frederick County, Maryland
 Mt. Pleasant (Woodstock, Maryland)
 Mount Pleasant (Union Bridge, Maryland)
 Mount Pleasant (Upper Marlboro, Maryland)
 Mount Pleasant (Newton, Massachusetts)
 Mount Pleasant, Michigan
 Mount Pleasant, Mississippi
 Mount Pleasant, Missouri
 Mount Pleasant, St. Louis, Missouri
 Mount Eisenhower, a New Hampshire mountain known as Mount Pleasant until 1970
 Mount Pleasant, Bergen County, New Jersey
 Mount Pleasant, Burlington County, New Jersey
 Mount Pleasant, Hunterdon County, New Jersey
 Mount Pleasant, Monmouth County, New Jersey
 Mount Pleasant, Newark, New Jersey
 Mount Pleasant, New York, a town in Westchester County
 Mount Pleasant (Indian Falls, New York), a historic farm
 Mount Pleasant, Ulster County, New York, a populated place
 Mount Pleasant (Ulster County, New York), a mountain
 Mount Pleasant, North Carolina
 Mount Pleasant, Cleveland, a neighborhood in Ohio
 Mount Pleasant, Ohio
 Mount Pleasant, Vinton County, Ohio
 Mount Pleasant, Pennsylvania, a borough in Westmoreland County, not to be confused with townships of the same name (see below)
 Mount Pleasant (mansion), Philadelphia, Pennsylvania
 Mount Pleasant, Bucks County, Pennsylvania
 Mount Pleasant, Providence, Rhode Island
 Mount Pleasant, South Carolina
 Mount Pleasant, Tennessee
 Mount Pleasant, Texas 
 Mount Pleasant, Utah 
 Mount Pleasant (Hague, Virginia)
 Mount Pleasant, Frederick County, Virginia
 Mount Pleasant (Staunton, Virginia)
 Mount Pleasant (Strasburg, Virginia)
 Mount Pleasant, Washington, D.C.
 Mount Pleasant, Green County, Wisconsin, a town
 Mount Pleasant, Wisconsin, village in Racine County
 Mount Pleasant Township (disambiguation)

U.S. Virgin Islands
 Mount Pleasant, Saint Croix, U.S. Virgin Islands
 Mount Pleasant, Saint John, U.S. Virgin Islands

Zimbabwe 
 Mount Pleasant, Harare

Media and entertainment 
 "Mount Pleasant", a song by Dragon Fli Empire from Conquest
 Mount Pleasant (film), a 2006 Canadian film directed by Ross Weber
 Mount Pleasant (TV series), a British comedy-drama television programme airing on Sky1

Other uses 
 Mount Pleasant (constituency), parliamentary constituency in Zimbabwe
 Mount Pleasant (cricket ground), a cricket ground in Batley, Yorkshire
 Mount Pleasant (mansion), a mansion located in Philadelphia, Pennsylvania
 Mount Pleasant, Sheffield, an 18th-century mansion in Sheffield, England
 Mount Pleasant Caldera, a volcano in southwestern New Brunswick, Canada
 Mount Pleasant Cemetery, Toronto, Ontario
 Mount Pleasant High School (disambiguation)
 Mount Pleasant Radio Observatory, Tasmania, Australia
 Mount Pleasant Road, a street in Toronto, Ontario
 Mount Pleasant School (disambiguation)
 Mount Pleasant station (disambiguation), stations of the name
 Mount Pleasant Winery in Augusta, Missouri
 RAF Mount Pleasant, a British military base
 RCAF Station Mount Pleasant, Prince Edward Island

See also
 Mount Pleasant Commercial Historic District (disambiguation)
 Mount Pleasant Historic District (disambiguation)